The 1974–75 Virginia Squires season was the 5th season of the Squires in the American Basketball Association. The Squires, having sold talents such as Julius Erving and George Gervin in previous years in order to keep afloat, simply imploded with a lack of talent, losing 69 games, the worst in ABA history. Their longest winning streak was 3 games, from January 31 to February 3, 1975. At one point, they lost 15 straight games, from December 30, 1974 to January 26, 1975. The only victory they scored in March 1975 was their final victory as the team lost eight straight to close out the season. The team finished last in points per game at 99.0, with a middling 6th in points allowed with 109.5 per game.

Roster   
 33 Lloyd Batts - Shooting guard
 52 Lionel Billingy - Point forward
 20 Glen Combs - Shooting guard
 11 Darrell Elston - Shooting guard
 15 Lamar Green - Point forward
 14 Bill Higgins - Shooting guard
 30 George Irvine - Small forward
 31 Mike Jackson - Point forward
 44 Johnny Neumann - Shooting guard
 40 Barry Parkhill - Shooting guard
 22 Aulcie Perry - Center
 5 Cincy Powell - Small forward
 24 Red Robbins - Center
 13 Dave Twardzik - Point guard
 45 David Vaughn - Center
 42 Willie Wise - Small forward

Final standings

Eastern Division

Awards and honors
1975 ABA All-Star Game selection (game played on January 28, 1975)
Dave Twardzik

References

External links
 RememberTheABA.com 1974–75 regular season and playoff results
 Virginia Squires page

Virginia Squires
Virginia Squires
Virginia Squires, 1974-75
Virginia Squires, 1974-75